Stinkpot may mean:

Alternative common name for the common musk turtle
Alternative common name for the southern giant petrel
An incendiary weapon used in the 19th century by Qing dynasty Chinese sailors against British ships during the Second Opium War. 
Slang term referring to a motorboat (usually used by sailors)
Stink bomb, a device to create an offensive smell

Animal common name disambiguation pages